Baron Bourke of Castleconnell was a title in the Peerage of Ireland created on 16 May 1580 for Sir William Bourke. The eighth baron was attainted and the barony forfeited in 1691.

Barons Bourke of Castleconnell (1580)
William Bourke, 1st Baron Bourke of Connell (died 1584)
John Bourke, 2nd Baron Bourke of Connell (died 1592)
Richard Bourke, 3rd Baron Bourke of Connell (died 1599)
Thomas Bourke, 4th Baron Bourke of Connell (died 1599)
Edmund Bourke, 5th Baron Bourke of Connell (1598-1638)
William Bourke, 6th Baron Bourke of Connell (died )
Thomas Bourke, 7th Baron Bourke of Connell (died )
William Bourke, 8th Baron Bourke of Connell (died ) (forfeit 1691 for being loyal to King James II  )

See also
House of Burgh, an Anglo-Norman and Hiberno-Norman dynasty founded in 1193
Baron Bourke of Brittas
Sir Edmund de Burgh (1298–1338), Irish knight and ancestor of the Burke family of Clanwilliam

References

Forfeited baronies in the Peerage of Ireland
Noble titles created in 1580